Sandnes  is a village in Sør-Varanger Municipality in Troms og Finnmark county, Norway. The place has its own primary school.

The local sports club, Sandnes IL, runs one of Finnmark's best cross country arenas. Sandnes also has an alpine skiing resort, run by the same sports club, which is called Sandnes Alpine Center.

References

Sør-Varanger
Villages in Finnmark
Populated places of Arctic Norway